Fibrofolliculomas are 2 to 4 mm in diameter, dome-shaped, yellowish or skin-colored papules usually located on the head, neck, and upper trunk. They are characteristically seen in Birt–Hogg–Dubé syndrome.

See also 
 List of cutaneous conditions
 List of cutaneous neoplasms associated with systemic syndromes
 Trichodiscoma

References 

Epidermal nevi, neoplasms, and cysts